Lovin' and Learnin' is the fifth studio album by American country music singer Tanya Tucker. It was released on January 5, 1976, by MCA Records. The album was produced by Jerry Crutchfield and includes two top five singles, "Don't Believe My Heart Can Stand Another You" and "You've Got Me to Hold On To".

Critical reception

The review published in the February 14, 1976 issue of Billboard said, "Tucker still does not appear to be singing quite as strongly as she could be, but the effort is a creditable one. Stronger country orientation than rock, which is to be expected. Best part of the LP are the expressive, interpretive vocals on the best of the cuts and some fine new songs from Billy Ray Reynolds, Barbara Keith and Doug Tibbles. Best cuts: "Don't Believe My Heart Can Stand Another You" (easily the best song on the album), "Pride of Franklin Country", and "Leave Him Alone". LP is first produced by Jerry Crutchfield."

The review published by Cashbox in the January 17, 1976 issue said, "Tanya says, "I’m 15, and you’re gonna hear from me", and we absolutely take her at her word as she expresses herself incomparably on this album. Produced by Jerry Crutchfield, it’s terrific Tanya throughout."

Commercial performance
The album peaked at No. 3 on the US Billboard Hot Country LPs chart and No. 91 in Canada on the RPM Top Albums chart.

The album's first single, "Don't Believe My Heart Can Stand Another You", was released in December 1975 and peaked at No. 4 on the US Billboard Hot Country Singles chart and No. 1 in Canada on the RPM Country Singles chart. The second single, "Ain't That a Shame", was released in March 1976 only in the UK. The second North American single and third overall, "You've Got Me to Hold On To", was released in April 1976 and peaked at No. 3 on the US Billboard Hot Country Singles chart and No. 3 in Canada on the RPM Country Singles chart. The fourth and final single, "Pride of Franklin County", was released exclusively in Japan in May 1976.

Track listing

Personnel
Adapted from the album liner notes.
Tanya Tucker – lead and background vocals
Jerry Crutchfield – background vocals
Janie Fricke – background vocals
Larry Gatlin – background vocals
Bergen White – background vocals
Jerry Carrigan – drums
Charlie Daniels – violin
Pete Drake – steel guitar
Steve Gibson – guitar
Glenn Keener – guitar
Charlie McCoy – harmonica
Nashville's Famous Strings – strings
Hargus "Pig" Robbins – keyboards
Billy Sanford – guitar
Jack Williams – bass guitar

Charts
Album

Singles

References

1976 albums
Tanya Tucker albums
MCA Records albums
Albums produced by Jerry Crutchfield